Nahlin is a luxury yacht and one of the last of three large steam yachts constructed in the UK. She was built for Lady Yule, film financier and horse breeder, and was launched in 1930. She is owned by British industrial entrepreneur Sir James Dyson, who purchased her from Lord Bamford, Chairman of JCB. The name Nahlin is taken from a Native American word meaning "fleet of foot" and the yacht has a figurehead depicting a Native American wearing a feathered headdress beneath the bowsprit.

History 
Lady Yule ordered three private yachts in 1929 from John Brown & Company, Clydebank, with Nahlin being the first built. In 1934 Nahlin was classified as one of the biggest private yachts ever built in the UK. Numbered 533 at the yard, she was the vessel constructed by Brown's immediately before the RMS Queen Mary.

In 1930 Lady Yule and her daughter Gladys embarked on a world cruise in the NAHLIN. They stayed in New Zealand, Australia and Miami between 1931 and 1934. The archives of the yacht are held by the National Maritime Museum at Greenwich. 

In 1936 Nahlin was chartered by King Edward VIII—rather than using the Royal yacht , to "enable the avoidance of formality accorded to Royalty"—and used by him and Mrs. Wallis Simpson during a cruise in the Adriatic Sea. As Lady Yule was a strict teetotaler, the king took over the library on the shade deck where he replaced the books with bottles.
The presence of Simpson on board the yacht first "alerted the world's media to the impending abdication crisis." Informal photographs of Edward and Simpson on board together during the cruise were not published in Britain but became front-page news in the United States.

The yacht was bought in 1937 by King Carol II of Romania for £120,000 and renamed Luceafarul (Evening Star), and, later, Libertatea (Liberty). When the Romanian monarch abdicated in 1940, she became the property of the Romanian Ministry of Culture and was tied up in the port of Galați on the Danube as a museum and later as a floating restaurant.<ref>Back Door to Byzantium  – Bill & Laurel Cooper (page 222) – Adlard Coles Nautical – 1997 –  </ref>

After the 1989 revolution and fall of communism in Romania, although classified as cultural patrimony, the yacht dubiously became property of a small Romanian private company called SC Regal SA Galaţi and was rediscovered by luxury yacht broker Nicholas Edmiston, who purchased the vessel in 1998 for $265,000 and in 1999 sent her to Falmouth, Cornwall, on the heavy-lift ship Swift. Being a piece of cultural patrimony, a temporary permit had to be issued by the government for her to be taken outside Romanian borders, supposedly to be rebuilt by the original manufacturer, the sole keeper of the original plans for the vessel. She was then towed to Devonport, Plymouth and then to Liverpool for restoration. The yacht ceased to be Romanian cultural patrimony in 2002. Phase one of the restoration project was delayed when restorers Cammell Laird went into receivership.

In 2006, James and Deirdre Dyson purchased the yacht and spent five years comprehensively rebuilding and restoring it. The ship was recommissioned in 2010 as the Nahlin and is registered again in Glasgow, Scotland. The refit was undertaken by Nobiskrug at Rendsburg, Germany, and completion was at the Blohm+Voss shipyard, Hamburg, where diesel engines replaced her old steam turbines. During restoration, the yacht's original mahogany-hulled  ship-to-shore tender, believed lost for 60 years, was located in Scotland, having been fully restored by owner Willie McCullough. It has now been reunited with the yacht.

 Design 
She is fitted with a propulsion system of 4 × 2,200 hp engines, each providing 1,619 kilowatts; total power for the boat is, therefore, 8,800 hp or 6,475 kW. Nahlin'' maximum speed is 17.1 knots. She was originally furnished with six en-suite staterooms for guests, a gymnasium, a ladies' sitting room with sea views on three sides, and a library.

See also 
List of motor yachts by length

References 
Footnotes

Bibliography

External links 
 Nahlin at Ship Spotting World including sightings

Steam yachts
Royal and presidential yachts
1930 ships